How to Dismantle an Atomic Bomb is the eleventh studio album by Irish rock band U2. It was released on 22 November 2004 in the United Kingdom by Island Records and a day later in the United States by Interscope Records. Much like their previous album All That You Can't Leave Behind (2000), the record exhibits a more mainstream rock sound after the band experimented with alternative rock and dance music in the 1990s. It was produced by Steve Lillywhite, with additional production from Chris Thomas, Jacknife Lee, Nellee Hooper, Flood, Daniel Lanois, Brian Eno, and Carl Glanville.

Looking for a more hard-hitting sound than that of their previous album, U2 began recording How to Dismantle an Atomic Bomb in February 2003 with Thomas. After nine months of work, the band had an album's worth of material ready for release, but they were not satisfied with the results. The group subsequently enlisted Lillywhite to take over as producer in Dublin in January 2004. Lillywhite, along with his assistant Lee, spent six months with the band reworking songs and encouraging better performances. U2 lead singer Bono described the album as "our first rock album. It's taken us twenty years or whatever it is, but this is our first rock album." Thematically, the record touches on life, death, love, war, faith, and family.

How to Dismantle an Atomic Bomb received generally positive reviews from critics and reached number one in 30 countries, including the US, where first-week sales of 840,000 copies nearly doubled the band's previous personal best. The album and its singles won all nine Grammy Awards for which they were nominated (U2 themselves were awarded eight out of the nine). It was also the fourth-highest-selling album of 2004, with almost ten million copies sold, and it yielded several successful singles, such as "Vertigo", "City of Blinding Lights", and "Sometimes You Can't Make It on Your Own". The album was included on Rolling Stones list of the "100 Best Albums of the Decade" at number 68.

Writing and recording
Lead singer Bono explained that he had to ask himself a few hard questions before carrying on recording: "I wanted to check where I was to where I am. So I went back and listened to all the music that made me want to be in a band, right from the Buzzcocks, Siouxsie and the Banshees, Echo & The Bunnymen, all that stuff. And what was interesting is, that was what a lot of people in bands now are listening to anyway. So in a funny way, it made us completely contemporary."

Looking for a harder-hitting rock sound than that of their previous record, All That You Can't Leave Behind, U2 began recording How to Dismantle an Atomic Bomb in February 2003 with producer Chris Thomas. After nine months of work, the band had completed an album's worth of songs. In October, they met in Dublin to review their work. Bono and guitarist the Edge believed it was good enough to release; Bono said, "All we needed was the assent of the politburo and the record would have been out for Christmas." Bassist Adam Clayton and drummer Larry Mullen Jr., however, disagreed with their bandmates and voted against releasing the record. Mullen said that the songs "had no magic", while Clayton said, "When it comes to signing off on a project, you ask questions like, 'Have we got a first single to open the campaign?' Frankly, we were missing more than just a first single." Clayton and Mullen also had a nagging feeling that All That You Can't Leave Behind had been overpraised when it only produced one hit—"Beautiful Day". Clayton thought that if U2's goal was to continue to be the world's biggest band, they needed three or four hits from their album that could attract new fans.

The group brought in their long-time producer Steve Lillywhite to mediate the disagreement. After they played him the album, Lillywhite assessed that it felt like "it had the weight of the world on its shoulders. It certainly wasn't any fun." After lengthy discussions, Bono and the Edge were convinced that the album needed more work. Bono thought their songs were good but admitted "good won't bring you to tears or make you want to leave your house and tour for a year". The group subsequently dismissed Thomas and enlisted Lillywhite to take over as the album's producer in Dublin in January 2004. Lillywhite, along with his assistant Jacknife Lee, spent six months with the band reworking songs and encouraging better performances. Several other producers received credits on the album, including Daniel Lanois, Brian Eno, Flood, Carl Glanville, and Nellee Hooper; Bono acknowledged that the involvement of multiple producers affected the record's "sonic cohesion".

A demo version of the album (guitarist the Edge's copy) was stolen while the band were having their photo taken for a magazine in France in July 2004. It contained unfinished versions of several songs that made it onto the album. The band publicly announced that if those tracks were leaked online, they would release the album immediately via the iTunes Store. Several months later, the finished album was leaked online, but the band did not release it earlier, despite previous comments.

In late 2004, "Mercy", an unreleased track taken from the How to Dismantle an Atomic Bomb sessions, surfaced on the Internet through a fan who had been given a copy of the album containing the extra track. The track is of less than standard audio quality, but managed to become a favorite on fan websites. It was cut from the final release, but was described by Blender as "a six-and-a-half-minute outpouring of U2 at its most uninhibitedly U2-ish". The lyrics to the song can be found in the booklet for the Special Limited Edition. A significantly revised version of the song was performed during the European leg of the U2 360° Tour; it made its live debut on 12 September 2010 during the second Zurich concert, and was officially released as the opening track on the band's Wide Awake in Europe vinyl-only live EP that November.

Composition
As with All That You Can't Leave Behind, this album finds U2 returning to "more 'stripped down' rock and pop sounds", according to musicologist Susan Fast.

Adam Clayton said of Atomic Bomb, "It's very much a guitar record. "Vertigo", "Love and Peace", "City of Blinding Lights", "All Because of You", all pretty up, rocky tunes. A lot of them are a kick-back to our very early days, so it's like with each year we have gathered a little bit more and this is what we are now."

In 2003, Bono said one of their new songs called "Full Metal Jacket" was "the mother of all rock songs" and "the reason to make a new album". A similar demo called "Native Son" was also recorded. Both of these demos would later become "Vertigo".

Contemporary Christian artist Michael W. Smith joined the band in the studio during the Atomic Bomb sessions and worked on at least one track with them, entitled "North Star". That track, which was a tribute to Johnny Cash, has not yet surfaced officially or unofficially in any form. A song introduced by Bono as "North Star" was played in Turin during the U2 360° Tour; however, it is unknown whether or not this is the same song that was worked on during the sessions. Other tracks, such as "Shark Soup" (another version of "Vertigo"), "Lead Me In The Way I Should Go", and "You Can't Give Away Your Heart", were referenced in the media and by the band themselves, but have not been released.

The very earliest versions of "Love and Peace or Else" originated during the recording sessions for All That You Can't Leave Behind. It serves as Atomic Bombs "big plea for peace" song, following in the footsteps of "Sunday Bloody Sunday", "Miss Sarajevo", "Please", and "Peace on Earth". During performances on the Vertigo Tour, "Love and Peace Or Else" featured Mullen moving out to the center of the ellipse-shaped ramp, where he played a floor tom and crash cymbal for the majority of the song. Near the end, Bono took over and played the drum until the song segued into the opening drumbeat of "Sunday Bloody Sunday". Most live performances of the song also saw Mullen singing the "release, release, release, release" part during the chorus alongside Bono.

"Crumbs from Your Table" is about the relationship between Western countries and developing countries. The verses and chorus address the relationship from the perspective of citizens from the developing world, focusing on the disparity between the long-term socioeconomic planning stressed by the West ("You speak in signs and wonders") and the developing world's immediate need for sustenance ("But I'm begging for the crumbs from your table"). One line ("You speak in signs and wonders") was meant as a criticism of the Catholic Church. The bridge ("Where you live should not decide / Whether you live or whether you die") is statement from Bono that follows with the theme in his speeches in which he tries to raise awareness about African poverty. Bono stated on a bonus DVD included with special editions of the album that the band has no recollection of writing the song, as they were intoxicated at the time. A studio performance is also included on the aforementioned bonus DVD. It was only played a handful on times during the third leg of the Vertigo Tour.

"One Step Closer" is a slow tempo song, with Bono's lyrics centered around traffic images, leading to the singer being stranded on a refuge island. The origins of the song go back to the All That You Can't Leave Behind sessions.  It was revived for Atomic Bomb, with Lanois introducing a pedal steel guitar, in addition to guitars from the Edge and Bono, and musical influences varying from country music to The Velvet Underground making themselves felt.  One recording of the song ran for more than 15 minutes, with Bono adding many verses that were subsequently dropped. Jacknife Lee also contributed to the final form of the recording. "One Step Closer" is billed in the album with thanks to Noel Gallagher of Oasis. The title of the song comes from a conversation Bono had with Gallagher about Bono's dying father, Bob Hewson. Bono asked, "Do you think he believes in God?" to which Gallagher replied, "Well, he's one step closer to knowing." Through the end of the Vertigo Tour, the song had never been performed in any U2 concert. The title of the album derives from a lyric in the song "Fast Cars", which was only available on some versions of the album.

Promotion

For the album release, U2 partnered with Apple Inc. for several cross-promotions. "Vertigo" was featured on a widely aired television advertisement for the company's iPod music player. Additionally, a special edition U2-branded iPod was released bearing the black and red color scheme of the album, as well as laser-engraved autographs of each member on the back. The Complete U2, an iTunes Store-exclusive box set featuring 448 tracks, including previously unreleased content was also released. Proceeds from the iPod and iTunes partnerships were donated to charity. A live version of "Original of the Species" from the concert film Vertigo 2005: Live from Chicago was later featured in commercials for the video iPod. Several CD copies of the album have the message "Miss You Sugar" on the bottom of the CD near the matrix number.

The compilation Medium, Rare & Remastered and the EP Unreleased and Rare, included in The Complete U2 box set, contains previously unreleased tracks, six of which were from the recording sessions for How to Dismantle an Atomic Bomb:

 "Xanax and Wine" (alternate early version of "Fast Cars")
 "Native Son" (alternate early version of "Vertigo")
 "Smile" (outtake from the How to Dismantle an Atomic Bomb Sessions)
 "Sometimes You Can't Make It on Your Own" (early version)
 "All Because of You" (alternate version)
 "Yahweh" (alternate mix by Chris Thomas)

U2 made various promotional appearances on television. On 20 November 2004, U2 appeared as the musical guests on Saturday Night Live, performing "Vertigo", "Sometimes You Can't Make It on Your Own", and "I Will Follow". Two days later, on the day of the album's release, U2 performed on a flat-bed truck, which drove through much of downtown New York City. Footage of the flat-bed performance was used for the music video of "All Because of You". The drive ended at the Brooklyn Bridge, under which the band performed a "secret gig" in Empire Fulton Ferry State Park. Part of the concert was broadcast in an MTV television programme and released in the EP Live from Under the Brooklyn Bridge.

Formats
How to Dismantle an Atomic Bomb was released in four different formats:
Standard Edition – with album CD
Double CD/DVD Edition – with album CD and bonus DVD, featuring making of the album footage and bonus performances
Special Limited Edition – with album CD, bonus DVD, and a hardcover book, featuring extracts from band members, song lyrics, original paintings, illustrations and photography
Vinyl LP

Singles
The album was preceded by the lead single "Vertigo", which was released on 24 September 2004. The song topped the charts in several countries, including the UK, reached number 31 on the US Billboard Hot 100, and topped the Modern Rock Tracks chart. It also topped the digital downloads chart in both the US and the UK, becoming U2's best-selling digital single ever in the US, with 2× Platinum status (note that for downloads, Platinum status was obtained at 200,000 copies sold). Upon release the song received extensive airplay and was an international hit, being featured in a popular iPod television commercial. The song lent its namesake to the band's Vertigo Tour.

The second single in the UK was "Sometimes You Can't Make It on Your Own", released on 7 February 2005. The song is about Bono's relationship with his dying father. The song debuted at number one on the UK Singles Chart, becoming U2's first-ever follow-up single to top the charts. On US adult contemporary radio, it reached number 15 on the Adult Top 40 and also appeared on the Modern Rock Tracks chart, the Pop 100, and the Hot 100.

"City of Blinding Lights" was the third UK release. It peaked at number 2 and spent nine weeks on the chart. It also placed on the US Adult Top 40.

The second single in the US was "All Because of You". Although it received some airplay on rock radio, reaching number 6 on the Modern Rock Tracks chart and number 20 on the Mainstream Rock Tracks chart, the song had little mainstream exposure. When released in the UK, it peaked at number 4 but only spent four weeks on the chart.

"Original of the Species" was released as a promotional single in the US. It peaked at number 6 on the Triple A Chart according to mediaguide.com and the video has reached number 12 on VH1's top 20 video countdown. The track has also made brief appearances on the Hot AC charts according to Radio and Records and MediaGuide.

Reception

Critical reaction

How to Dismantle an Atomic Bomb received generally positive reviews from critics. At Metacritic, which assigns a normalized score out of 100 to ratings from critics, the album received an average score of 79 based on 26 reviews. Rob Sheffield of Rolling Stone described it as "grandiose music from grandiose men, sweatlessly confident in the execution of their duties", believing the album was well served by not tamping down Bono's ego or ambitions. Sheffield praised "Sometimes You Can't Make It on Your Own", calling it "a reminder that what makes U2 so big isn't really their clever ideas, or even their intelligence — it's the warmth that all too few rock stars have any idea how to turn into music". Johnny Davis of Q said that the Edge's guitar playing "makes this record" with his "arsenal of guitar noises that bring to mind a particularly impatient boy with a new box of indoor fireworks". Responding to Bono's quote about the group wanting to stave off a decline, Davis said, "They've succeeded in not becoming crap quite admirably." Robert Hilburn of the Los Angeles Times called the album "triumphant", praising U2's "journey from adolescence to maturity" over their career as one that few groups could make "with their creative vision so fully intact". He said that Bono lyrically "explores epic themes, from faith to family, with such indelible grace that the CD stands with 'The Joshua Tree' and 'Achtung Baby' as one of the Irish quartet's essential works". Dan Martin of NME called it "a classic U2 album, but also a breathtakingly modern heavy fucker", adding that "Bono's genius is that his inner monologue is so huge and heroic that it matches the scale of the music". Steve Morse of The Boston Globe called it a "nakedly honest, uplifting album" and their most personal one since The Joshua Tree. He called it "a joy to see the group rekindle its shimmering '80s guitar-pop sound" and was encouraged that their music "comes so strongly from the gut once again, without the latest techno-experimental production techniques." Ann Powers of Blender called the album a "tour de force of tune and mood", adding, "because U2's sound has come to signify an open heart... it nearly always feels fresh, the way a new flame does". She thought that Bono lyrically "wields sentimentality like a switchblade" but also said that "U2's music is so broad and welcoming it can express ardor equally well for Christ, wives, supermodels, children or Bishop Desmond Tutu".

Stephen Troussé of Uncut called it "their most unabashedly strident record since The Unforgettable Fire" and said that songs such as "City of Blinding Lights" and "All Because of You" gave "the sense of a band flexing muscles they haven't used in years". He remarked about the melancholic undertow of Bono's lyrics, believing that the "lines that stay with you speak of a creeping malaise". Alexis Petridis of The Guardian said that the album "may be unadventurous and melodramatic, but it is packed with disarming moments". He thought the group had embraced the clichéd elements of their 1980s music but said, "Driven by a ferociously powerful rhythm section, U2 sound pleasingly raw, particularly next to the current wave of stadium rock pretenders". He lamented the abandonment of their 1990s experimentation, but appreciated their retention of self-awareness, concluding, "it seems highly unlikely anyone will laugh at U2 again". David Browne of Entertainment Weekly questioned U2's motivations for back-pedaling musically but called them "one of the few remaining bands who can make pop-chart lust work for them, as Atomic Bomb intermittently demonstrates". Greg Kot of the Chicago Tribune said that the record "marks a retreat from innovation and daring, and re-immerses the Irish quartet in the comfort zone of its earliest successes". He believed the band had "settl[ed] into middle age by recycling its best riffs and ideas" and that those musical ideas were "destined to pale in coming years as second-hand versions of those classic albums". Amanda Petrusich of Pitchfork called the record "brash, grungy, and loud" but not "especially surprising", judging it to contain a "tiny handful of outstanding tracks and a whole mess of schmaltzy filler". She criticised Bono's "vague, cliched observations, his sentiments always awkwardly bombastic or hopelessly maudlin" and thought the album's biggest issue was "that it sounds so much like U2". Keith Harris of The Village Voice said that the lyrics were marred by "legions of rampant clichés" and that the album's producers "simply construct a U2 album in miniature, mixing in the Edge's processed-guitar trademark whenever you fear they're straying into unforgivable un-U2ness. That's just not enough."

Commercial performance
Following its 22 November 2004 release, the album debuted at number one in 34 countries, including the US Billboard 200 (with sales of 840,000), the UK Albums Chart, and the Australian ARIA Charts. The album has sold 9 million copies worldwide. According to Nielsen SoundScan, the album has sold 3.3 million copies in the US through March 2014.

Accolades
How to Dismantle an Atomic Bomb was rated the best album of 2004 by USA Today, Paste, and The New York Times. Hilburn of the Los Angeles Times called it the second-best album of the year, and it was ranked fourth respectively by Q in its list of the best albums of the year. The Village Voice rated it the eighth-best album of 2004, while PopMatters ranked it 25th. It was included in Rolling Stones Top 50 Albums of 2004.

How to Dismantle an Atomic Bomb and its songs won eight Grammy Awards overall in 2005 and 2006, sweeping all of the categories in which they were nominated. In 2005, "Vertigo" won in three categories: Best Rock Song, Best Rock Performance by a Duo or Group with Vocal, and Best Short Form Music Video. In 2006, "Sometimes You Can't Make It on Your Own" was awarded Song of the Year and Best Rock Performance by a Duo or Group with Vocal, "City of Blinding Lights" was awarded Best Rock Song, and How to Dismantle an Atomic Bomb won for Best Rock Album and Album of the Year. The album producer's Steve Lillywhite was also awarded Producer of the Year, Non Classical in 2006.

Rolling Stone rated it the 68th-best album of the decade, while "Vertigo" was ranked the 64th-best song. Despite all of the critical acclaim for the album, Bono would later state that "[t]here are no weak songs. But as an album, the whole isn't greater than the sum of its parts, and it fucking annoys me."

Vertigo Tour

In support of the album, U2 launched the Vertigo Tour, which featured five legs and a total of 131 shows. The first and third legs featured indoor concerts in North America, while the second and fourth legs featured outdoor concerts in Europe, Mexico and South America, respectively. The final leg, which saw the band touring the Pacific, was delayed due to an illness suffered by The Edge's daughter Sian. The stage design of the indoor Vertigo Tour shows was a stripped-down, intimate affair for the fans and featured an ellipse-shaped B-stage extending from the main stage. In total, the Vertigo Tour had sold 4,619,021 tickets for a total gross of $389 million; the gross was the second-highest such figure ever. Three concert films depicting the tour, Vertigo 2005: Live from Chicago, Vertigo: Live from Milan, and U2 3D, were recorded.

Track listing

Notes
 – additional production
"Fast Cars" is a bonus track on the Japan, UK and Ireland CD edition, Special Limited Edition in all regions, and the digital version, included in The Complete U2. A new mix was featured on the "All Because of You" single.

Note
Handwritten lyrics for "Sometimes You Can't Make It On Your Own" are included on the DVD as an Easter egg.

Personnel
U2
Bono – lead vocals, additional guitar , piano 
The Edge – guitar, backing/additional vocals , piano , keyboards , additional percussion , synthesiser 
Adam Clayton – bass guitar
Larry Mullen Jr. – drums, percussion, backing vocal 

Additional performers
Jacknife Lee – synthesisers/additional synthesisers , programming , keyboards , additional guitar atmospherics 
Daniel Lanois – additional guitar and pedal steel , mandolin , shaker 
Carl Glanville – additional percussion and synthesisers 
Brian Eno – synthesisers 
Fabien Waltmann – programming

Charts

Weekly charts

Year-end charts

Decade-end charts

Weekly singles charts

Certifications

References

Bibliography

External links
How to Dismantle an Atomic Bomb at U2.com

U2 albums
2004 albums
Grammy Award for Album of the Year
Island Records albums
Albums produced by Brian Eno
Albums produced by Chris Thomas (record producer)
Albums produced by Steve Lillywhite
Albums produced by Daniel Lanois
Albums produced by Flood (producer)
Albums produced by Nellee Hooper
Albums produced by Jacknife Lee
Grammy Award for Best Rock Album
Interscope Records albums
Interscope Geffen A&M Records albums